CRED is an Indian fintech company, based in Bangalore. Founded in 2018 by Kunal Shah, it is a reward-based credit card payments app. Cred also lets users make house rent payments and provides short-term credit lines. Cred has received criticism for being overvalued and lacking a sound monetization strategy.

History 
Cred was founded in 2018 by Kunal Shah; by 2021, the company had onboarded over 5.9 million users and processed about 20% of all credit card bill payments in India. As of April 2021, Cred offered six different products - Cred RentPay, Cred Cash, Cred Pay, Cred Store, and Cred Travel Store, etc. However, on 20 August 2021, Cred also launched a Peer to Peer(P2P) lending feature known as Cred Mint that aims to monetise through its 7.5 million users.

Kunal Shah describes Cred as being a TrustTech company rather than a FinTech, and that his motivation to start Cred comes from solving trust issues in the Indian society, which he believes is key to economic prosperity.

Funding and financial results

Funding 
Cred raised funding from DST Global, Sequoia Capital (India), and Tiger Global, among other investors, through the four rounds of private funding so far. Cred posted losses of ₹360.31 crore in the 2020 fiscal year (FY20), caused primarily due to high expenditure on marketing and advertising.

In October 2021, Cred started to seek new investors, reporting a $5.5 billion valuation, up from $2.2 billion recorded in April 2021.

Kunal Shah is also an investor in an AI led adtech influencer marketing platform Kofluence. The company had raised a pre-series funding of $4 Million as of 8th February 2022.   

In June 2022, CRED, raised $80 million in Series F funding round led by Singapore's sovereign wealth fund, GIC. The Series F funding round will value the company at around $6.4 billion.

Marketing 
Cred became the official sponsor for the Indian Premier League for three years from 2020 to 2022. In 2021, Cred's advertising content and videos, made in-house featuring Indian celebrities, generated significant discourse in news and social media due to its peculiarity, which was both criticized and praised.

References

External links 
 

Indian companies established in 2018
Financial services companies established in 2018
Online financial services companies of India
Companies based in Bangalore
2018 establishments in Karnataka